Agabus bifarius is a species of predaceous diving beetle in the family Dytiscidae. It is found in Europe and Northern Asia (excluding China) and North America.

ITIS Taxonomic note: 
North American locality given as latitude 54.

References

Further reading

 
 
 
 
 

bifarius
Beetles described in 1837